The 2022–23 Syed Mushtaq Ali Trophy was the fifteenth season of the Syed Mushtaq Ali Trophy, a Twenty20 cricket tournament played in India. It was contested by 38 teams, divided into five groups, with eight teams in Group A. The tournament was announced by BCCI on 8 August 2022.

Points table

Fixtures

Round 1

Round 2

Round 3

Round 4

Round 5

Round 6

Round 7

References

2022 in Indian cricket
Domestic cricket competitions in 2022–23